France Crowning Art and Industry (French: La France couronnant l'Art et l'Industrie) is a 6.50 m (21 ft) tall limestone sculpture group which decorated the top of the entrance of Palais de l'Industrie, the main building of the 1855 international exhibition in Paris. It was moved to the park of Saint-Cloud in 1900 when the Palais de l'Industrie was demolished. The center group, composed of the three allegories (France, Art and Industry) is a work by sculptor Élias Robert. The two putti groups located on its sides are by Georges Diebolt. The wreaths France was carrying in her hands and most of the rays of the radiant crown she wears have been lost.

Precedents and influences

This sculpture is thought to have been inspired by Pierre Cartellier's bas-relief Victory in a quadriga distributing wreaths (1810), at the East entrance of the Louvre palace, and to be a possible inspiration for the Statue of Liberty in New York City.

A bas-relief on the same subject, entitled France distributing wreaths to the Arts and Industry, was sculpted by Jean-Baptiste Louis Roman in 1830 and is located on the wall behind the seat of the president of the National Assembly in the hemicycle of Palais Bourbon.

In 1851, Georges Diebolt sculpted La France rémunératrice (Remunerative France), a colossal female figure wearing and distributing wreaths, for an award ceremony on the Champs-Élysées, which was held for the French industrialists who had been distinguished at the London Great Exhibition. A small size bronze reduction was exhibited at the Exposition Universelle of 1855, and is now displayed at the Musée d'Orsay.

Gallery

Footnotes

External links
 Old postcard showing the sculpture in a better conservation state

Outdoor sculptures in France
Allegorical sculptures in France
19th century in art
History of Paris
World's fair architecture in France
Limestone statues
1855 sculptures